The following is a timeline of the history of the city of Almería, Spain.

Prior to 20th century

 955 CE - Town of Al-Mariyya established.
 1012 - Taifa of Almería established.
 1147 - Al-Mariyya taken by forces of Alfonso VII of León.
 1157 - Almohads in power.
 1238 - City becomes part of the kingdom of Granada.
 1309 - City besieged by forces of James II of Aragon.(es)
 1489 - Castilians in power.
 1492
 Roman Catholic Diocese of Almería established.
 Santo Domingo convent founded.
 1524 - Almería Cathedral construction begins.
 1591 - August: Battle of the Gulf of Almería (1591) fought offshore.
 1674 -  (church) built.
 1829 - Teatro Principal (theatre) opens.
 1834 - Almeria Sociedad Económica de los Amigos del País established.
 1840 -  founded.
 1842 - Population: 17,800.
 1845 - Biblioteca del Instituto Provincial de Segunda Enseñanza de Almería (library)  established.
 1860 - Crónica Meridional newspaper begins publication.
 1873 - 30 July: .
 1881 -  (theatre) built.
 1885 -  (sugar mill) begins operating.
 1887 -  (art school) founded.
 1888 - Plaza de toros de Almería (bullring) opens.
 1892 -  (market) built.
 1893 -  (train station) built.
 1900 - Population: 47,326.

20th century

 1908 - La Independencia newspaper begins publication.
 1916 - Diario de Almería newspaper begins publication.
 1921 -  built.
 1932 - Archivo Histórico Provincial de Almería (archives) established.
 1933 - Museum of Almería founded.
 1937 - 31 May: Bombardment of Almería by German forces.
 1939 - La Voz de Almería newspaper begins publication.
 1947
 Biblioteca Francisco Villaespesa (library) active.
  (church) built in the  barrio.
 1968 - Almería Airport begins operating.
 1970 - Population: 114,510.
 1971 - AD Almería (football club) formed.
 1976 - Estadio Municipal Juan Rojas (stadium) opens.
 1980 -  founded.
 1989 - UD Almería (football club) formed.
 1992 - Centro Andaluz de la Fotografía established.
 1993 - University of Almería established.
 1997 -  (musical group) formed.

21st century

 2001
  (orchestra) formed.
 Population: 166,328.
 2003
 Ibn Tufayl Foundation for Arabic Studies established.
  becomes mayor.
 2004 - Estadio de los Juegos Mediterráneos (stadium) opens.
 2005 - 2005 Mediterranean Games held in Almeria.
 2007 -  (transit entity) created.
 2011 - Population: 189,680.
 2014 - Population: 193,351 city; 257,207 .
 2015 - Ramón Fernández-Pacheco becomes mayor.

See also
 
 List of emirs of Almería in 11th century CE
 
 List of municipalities in Almería
 Timelines of other cities in the autonomous community of Andalusia: Cádiz, Córdoba, Granada, Jaén, Jerez de la Frontera, Málaga, Seville

References

This article incorporates information from the Spanish Wikipedia.

Bibliography

in English

in Spanish

External links

 Items related to Almería, various dates (via Europeana)

History of Almería
Almeria